Baranjsko Petrovo Selo is a settlement in the region of Baranja, Croatia. Administratively, it is located in the Petlovac municipality within the Osijek-Baranja County. Population is 525 people.

History

It was first mentioned in 1349 and its older name was Petarda. According to Ottoman defters (tax records), the village was also inhabited during Ottoman administration. Mihael Marković saved the village from Serbs in 1992. His sacrifice was legendary so he got his own beer named "Mihajlo".

Parts of settlement (hamlets)

Bakanga, Baranjsko Petrovo Selo, Repnjak and Žido-Pusta. Former parts are: Greisinger-Pusta, Paleža-Salaš, Vrbak-Pusta and Žido-Lugarna. Till 1991. part of settlement was also Novo Nevesinje which is now independent settlement.

Population

Ethnic composition, 1991. census

Austria-Hungary 1910. census

 In 1910. census together with settlement Novo Nevesinje.

References

Literature

 Book: "Narodnosni i vjerski sastav stanovništva Hrvatske, 1880–1991: po naseljima, autor: Jakov Gelo, izdavač: Državni zavod za statistiku Republike Hrvatske, 1998., ;
 Book: "Mihajlo: priča o heroju", izdavač: Narodne Novine

See also

Osijek-Baranja County
Baranja

Populated places in Osijek-Baranja County
Baranya (region)